Ogle may refer to:

Places
 Ogle County, Illinois, United States
 Original name of Ashton, Illinois, a village
 Ogle, Kentucky, United States, an unincorporated community
 Ogle Township, Somerset County, Pennsylvania, United States
 Ogle, Northumberland, England, a village
 Ogle Castle in Northumberland, England
 Glen Ogle, Scotland

People
 Ogle (surname)
 Ogle family of Northumberland, England
 Ogle Marbury (1882–1955), American jurist and politician, Chief Judge of the supreme court of Maryland
 Ogle Moore (1801–1874), Irish Anglican priest

Titles
 Baron Ogle
 Earl of Ogle

Other uses
 Ogle Airport, near Georgetown, Guyana
 Ogle Design, a British design consultancy and onetime car maker
 OGLE, the Optical Gravitational Lensing Experiment survey
 Ogle DVD Player, open source software DVD player for Unix-like operating systems
 Ogle app, a smartphone-based social media application